The Church of Jesus Christ of Latter-day Saints in Hong Kong refers to the Church of Jesus Christ of Latter-day Saints (LDS Church) and its members in Hong Kong. In 2021, Hong Kong had the third most LDS Church members per capita in Asia behind the Philippines and Mongolia.

History

The Church of Jesus Christ of Latter-day Saints (LDS Church) has had a presence in Hong Kong since 1949. That year, the President of the Church sent Mormon missionaries to China to preach.

Stakes & district

As of February 2023, the Church of Jesus Christ of Latter-day Saints has 6 stakes and one district in Hong Kong:

Missions
China Hong Kong Mission
The geographical administrative area for the China Hong Kong Mission includes all of China. There are missionaries in Macau but as of 2007, there are no LDS Missionaries preaching within mainland China, although there are some service missionaries.

Temples

The Hong Kong China Temple was built in 1996 and is located at 2 Cornwall Street, Kowloon Tong. When it was completed it served also as a meetinghouse for a local congregation. The offices of the China Hong Kong Mission were also located in the building, as were living quarters for the temple president, mission president, and others. In 2005, with the completion of the new Church Administration Building in Wan Chai, the headquarters for the church moved there. In June 2010, with the completion of a new chapel across the street (street address: 18 Dorset Crescent), the meetinghouse and offices for the China Hong Kong Mission were relocated to this new building. The living quarters for the temple president, mission president, and six missionaries are still located in the temple building.

In January 2019, the LDS Church announced that the Hong Kong China Temple would close on July 8, 2019, for extensive renovations. The temple was reopened in June 2022.

See also 

Religion in Hong Kong

References

External links

 Church News - China, includes brief history of the LDS Church in China
 The Church of Jesus Christ of Latter-day Saints (Hong Kong) - Official Site (English)
 The Church of Jesus Christ of Latter-day Saints (Hong Kong) - Official Site (Chinese)
 ComeUntoChrist.org Latter-day Saints Visitor site

 
Hong Kong